Brendan Cauldwell (25 October 1922 – 12 January 2006) was an Irish radio, film and television actor.

Early life and education
Cauldwell was born in Fairview, Dublin. He was educated at O'Connell's Irish Christian Brothers School and went on to work in the insurance industry before becoming a full-time actor.

Career 
His interest in acting was encouraged by his uncle, who taught him different dialects in an attempt to manage his stammer.

In 1955, he joined the RTÉ Repertory Company. While with the company, he took part in more than 3,000 productions including the international 32-hour broadcast of Ulysses, the longest ever radio drama. In 1961, he performed in  The Weaver's Grave. Adapted and produced by Mícheál Ó hAodha, it was written by Galway author Seamus O'Kelly, and won the Prix Italia for Radio Drama. He played another Joycean role when he acted as Father Michael in Joseph Strick's film, A Portrait of the Artist as a Young Man (1977).

His performance as Hennessy in the RTÉ Television production of Strumpet City is regarded as particularly memorable, alongside an earlier performance as Rashers Tierney in the RTÉ Radio 1 production.

He acted in a number of stage, film, and radio productions, including Far and Away and Angela's Ashes. In 1996, he joined the cast of television programme Fair City , playing war veteran Paschal Mulvey, where he worked until 2005.

Personal life 
Cauldwell died in his sleep in 2006, aged 83.

Filmography

Film

Television

References

1922 births
2006 deaths
Irish male film actors
Irish male radio actors
Irish male television actors
People from Fairview, Dublin